"TV-Glotzer" is a song by Nina Hagen Band, first released in 1978 by CBS Records and later, on 29 August 1979, released in United Kingdom. The song is a cover of "White Punks on Dope" by The Tubes, with different German lyrics from the perspective of an East German unable to leave her country, who escapes by watching West German television, where "everything is so colorful". Hagen wrote the song before being expatriated from East Germany in 1976, following her stepfather Wolf Biermann. Later, when she formed the Nina Hagen Band in the West Berlin, they recorded the song and it became the lead single from their debut album Nina Hagen Band (1978).

Track listings
7" single (Germany)
"TV-Glotzer (White Punks On Dope)" – 5:15
"Heiss" – 4:11

7" single (UK)
"TV-Glotzer (White Punks On Dope)" – 5:15
"Naturträne" – 4:05

Credits and personnel
Nina Hagen – vocals, songwriter
Reinhold Heil – keyboards
Herwig Mitteregger – drums
Bernhard Potschka – guitar
Manfred Praeker – bass
Tom Müller – producer, engineer

References

External links

1978 singles
Nina Hagen songs
1977 songs
CBS Records singles